Foster Kennedy syndrome is a constellation of findings associated with tumors of the frontal lobe.

Although Foster Kennedy syndrome is sometimes called "Kennedy syndrome", it should not be confused with Kennedy disease, or spinal and bulbar muscular atrophy, which is named after William R. Kennedy.

Pseudo-Foster Kennedy syndrome is defined as one-sided optic atrophy with papilledema in the other eye but with the absence of a mass.

Presentation
The syndrome is defined as the following changes:
 optic atrophy in the ipsilateral eye
 disc edema in the contralateral eye
 central scotoma (loss of vision in the middle of the visual fields) in the ipsilateral eye

The presence of anosmia (loss of smell) ipsilateral to the eye demonstrating optic atrophy was historically associated with this syndrome, but is now understood to not strictly be associated with all cases.

This syndrome is due to optic nerve compression, olfactory nerve compression, and increased intracranial pressure (ICP) secondary to a mass (such as meningioma or plasmacytoma, usually an olfactory groove meningioma). There are other symptoms present in some cases such as nausea and vomiting, memory loss and emotional lability (i.e., frontal lobe signs).

Diagnosis
Brain tumor can be visualized very well on CT scan, but MRI gives better detail and is the
preferred study.
Clinical localization of brain tumors may be possible by virtue of specific neurologic deficits or
symptom patterns.
Tumor at the base of the frontal lobe produces inappropriate behavior, optic nerve
atrophy on the side of the tumor, and papilledema of the contralateral eye; anosmia on the side of the tumor may be found in certain cases of progressive disease.

Treatment
The treatment, and therefore prognosis, varies depending upon the underlying tumour. While awaiting surgical removal, treat any increased intracranial pressure
with high-dose steroids (i.e., dexamethasone).

History
The syndrome was first extensively noted by Robert Foster Kennedy in 1911, an Irish neurologist, who spent most of his career working in the United States of America. However, the first mention of the syndrome came from a William Gowers in 1893. Schultz–Zehden described the symptoms again in 1905. A later description was written by Wilhelm Uhthoff in 1915.

References

External links 

Eye diseases
Neurological disorders
Syndromes affecting the nervous system
Syndromes affecting the eye
Syndromes with tumors